Gabriel Lazarte (born 7 November 1997) is an Argentine professional footballer who plays as a left-back for Primera Nacional side Club Atlético Güemes.

Career
Lazarte began his senior career in 2016 with Chacarita Juniors, then of Primera B Nacional. He made his professional debut on 21 February in a 3–0 defeat to Guillermo Brown, he was subbed on for the final nine minutes in place of Federico Rosso. He played one more time in 2016, before featuring twenty-eight times in 2016–17 as Chacarita finished second which secured promotion to the Argentine Primera División. During that season, Lazarte signed a new contract with the club. His first appearance in the Primera División was in a 1–1 draw with Tigre in September 2017.

On 15 October 2020, after leaving Chacarita as his contract expired, Lazarte signed with Club Agropecuario Argentino. Ahead of the 2022 season, Lazarte moved to fellow league club Club Atlético Güemes.

Career statistics
.

References

External links

1997 births
Living people
Footballers from Buenos Aires
Argentine footballers
Association football defenders
Primera Nacional players
Argentine Primera División players
Chacarita Juniors footballers
Club Agropecuario Argentino players
Club Atlético Güemes footballers